Helga Livytska ( Weinzierl) is active in the Ukrainian women's movement and is a Ukrainian public figure. She was engaged in charitable activities, in particular, supported the Ukrainian Museum in New York at 203 Second Avenue. She participated in the work of the State Center of the Ukrainian People's Republic in the exile, in 1989, at the inauguration of the President of the Government of the Ukrainian People's Republic in exile Mykola Plaviuk. She was the wife of the president of the Ukrainian People's Republic in the exile of Mykola Livytskyi.

References

First Ladies of Ukraine
Ukrainian humanitarians
Women humanitarians
American people of Ukrainian descent
American people of German descent
People from Munich